Jaaji Mallige is a 2009 Indian Kannada-language romantic drama film written and directed by R. Anantharaju. A remake of the Tamil film Devathaiyai Kanden (2005), it stars Ajay Rao and Gowri Munjal. The film was released on 3 April 2009.

Plot 

Ramu, a tea seller, falls in love with a girl and they plan to marry. But her parents force her to marry a rich man instead.

Cast 
Ajay Rao as Ramu
Gowri Munjal as Uma
Naga Kiran as Dr. Prashanth
Komal
Bullet Prakash
Nagashekhar

Production 
Jaaji Mallige, a remake of Boopathy Pandian's Tamil film Devathaiyai Kanden (2005), was directed by R. Anantharaju who also wrote the screenplay, while Ramnarayan wrote the dialogues. The film was produced by Anaji Nagaraj and Jayanna under J N Combines. Cinematography was handled by M. R. Seenu, and editing by Suresh Muniraj.

Soundtrack 
The soundtrack was composed by Sadhu Kokila. All other tunes were retained from original Tamil film Devathaiyai Kanden except "Mogava Nee" which is an adaptation of a Hindi song "Chehra Kya Dekhte Ho" from the 1994 Hindi film Salaami.

Release and reception 
Jaaji Mallige was released on 3 April 2009. R G Vijayasarathy of Rediff.com rated the film 3 out of 5 and wrote, "Jaaji Mallige may please everyone -- those who have watched the original, and those who haven't". The Times of India wrote, "Director R Anantharaju could have done a much better job of this excellent romantic story with lively narration and a neat script". Mid-Day wrote, "Though the director Ananthraj has done a decent jog of the screenplay and script, the first half is actually pretty boring". Bangalore Mirror wrote, "Without being overly melodramatic, the director has managed to spin a credible tale. And this is the biggest asset of the film along with the comic scenes involving Komal". IANS wrote, "Jaaji Mallige wins because the director has just followed the original, except for including a little bit of comedy".

References

External links 
 

2000s Kannada-language films
2009 romantic drama films
Films scored by Sadhu Kokila
Indian romantic drama films
Kannada remakes of Tamil films